Perkos Dome (‘Kupol Perkos’ \'ku-pol 'per-kos\ is the ice dome rising to 2228 m in the west part of Detroit Plateau on Danco Coast in Graham Land, Antarctica.  It is situated between tributaries to Lilienthal, Sikorsky and Breguet Glaciers.

The ice dome is named after the Thracian god Perkos.

Location
British mapping in 1978.

Maps
British Antarctic Territory. Scale 1:200000 topographic map. DOS 610 Series, Sheet W 64 60. Directorate of Overseas Surveys, Tolworth, UK, 1978.
 Antarctic Digital Database (ADD). Scale 1:250000 topographic map of Antarctica. Scientific Committee on Antarctic Research (SCAR). Since 1993, regularly upgraded and updated.

Notes

References
 Bulgarian Antarctic Gazetteer. Antarctic Place-names Commission. (details in Bulgarian, basic data in English)
 Perkos Dome. SCAR Composite Gazetteer of Antarctica

External links
 Perkos Dome. Copernix satellite image

Ice caps of Antarctica
Bodies of ice of Graham Land
Bulgaria and the Antarctic
Danco Coast